Ophiostoma is a genus of fungi within the family Ophiostomataceae. It was circumscribed in 1919 by mycologists Hans Sydow and Paul Sydow.

Species

Ophiostoma adjuncti
Ophiostoma ainoae
Ophiostoma allantosporum
Ophiostoma angusticollis
Ophiostoma araucariae
Ophiostoma bacillisporum
Ophiostoma bicolor
Ophiostoma bragantinum
Ophiostoma brevicolle
Ophiostoma brunneociliatum
Ophiostoma brunneum
Ophiostoma cantabriense
Ophiostoma canum
Ophiostoma carpenteri
Ophiostoma clavatum
Ophiostoma colliferum
Ophiostoma coronatum
Ophiostoma cuculatum
Ophiostoma distortum
Ophiostoma epigloeum
Ophiostoma flexuosum
Ophiostoma grande
Ophiostoma himal-ulmi
Ophiostoma longicollum
Ophiostoma manitobense
Ophiostoma megalobrunneum
Ophiostoma microsporum
Ophiostoma minuta-bicolor
Ophiostoma minutum
Ophiostoma multiannulatum
Ophiostoma narcissi
Ophiostoma neglectum
Ophiostoma nigrocarpum
Ophiostoma nigrum
Ophiostoma novo-ulmi
Ophiostoma pallidobrunneum
Ophiostoma penicillatum
Ophiostoma perfectum
Ophiostoma piceae
Ophiostoma piceaperdum
Ophiostoma polonicum
Ophiostoma polyporicola
Ophiostoma populinum
Ophiostoma radiaticola
Ophiostoma ranaculosum
Ophiostoma retusi
Ophiostoma retusum
Ophiostoma rollhansenianum
Ophiostoma roraimense
Ophiostoma rostrocoronatum
Ophiostoma serpens
Ophiostoma seticolle
Ophiostoma setosum
Ophiostoma sparsum
Ophiostoma spinosum
Ophiostoma splendens
Ophiostoma tenellum
Ophiostoma tremulo-aureum
Ophiostoma triangulosporum
Ophiostoma trinacriforme
Ophiostoma ulmi
Ophiostoma valdivianum
Ophiostoma wageneri

References

Ophiostomatales
Sordariomycetes genera
Taxa named by Hans Sydow
Taxa named by Paul Sydow
Taxa described in 1919